Károly Gábor Hárspataki (born 27 February 1996) is a Hungarian karateka. He won one of the bronze medals in the men's 75 kg event at the 2020 Summer Olympics held in Tokyo, Japan. In 2019, he won one of the bronze medals in the men's kumite 75 kg event at the 2019 European Games held in Minsk, Belarus.

In 2021, he qualified at the World Olympic Qualification Tournament held in Paris, France to compete at the 2020 Summer Olympics in Tokyo, Japan. In November 2021, he competed in the men's 75 kg event at the 2021 World Karate Championships held in Dubai, United Arab Emirates.

He competed in the men's kumite 75 kg event at the 2022 World Games held in Birmingham, United States.

Achievements

References

External links 
 
 

1996 births
Living people
Place of birth missing (living people)
Hungarian male karateka
European Games bronze medalists for Hungary
European Games medalists in karate
Karateka at the 2019 European Games
Karateka at the 2020 Summer Olympics
Medalists at the 2020 Summer Olympics
Olympic medalists in karate
Olympic bronze medalists for Hungary
Olympic karateka of Hungary
Competitors at the 2022 World Games
21st-century Hungarian people